Louis Spohr's String Quartet No. 6 ("Gran Quatuor" ) in G minor, Op. 27, was completed in 1812. Dedicated to Count Razumovsky, the dedicatee of Beethoven, Opus 59. string quartets, the composition, like the earlier String Quartet No. 3, is a concertante work with the musical emphasis being placed on the first violinist, while the other players act as accompaniment. Keith Warsop notes that the second Adagio movement seems to have been adapted from sketches to an unfinished violin concerto.

Movements
The composition is in four-movement form:
Allegro moderato
Adagio
Menuetto: Allegro
Finale: Vivace

References

06
Compositions in G minor
1812 compositions